Líshān Lǎomǔ is the goddess of Mount Li in Chinese religion. She is a popular female immortal in the Taoist pantheon, and a high-ranking one according to some late sources. Her origins are said to derive from Nü Wa, the legendary creator and mother goddess.

Legends
The Lishan Laomu is one of the more popular nüxian (′female celestial/immortal′) revered in the Chinese folk religion or Taoist belief.

The Lishan Laomu legend consists of an accretion of a number of stories about her. Her disciples and apprentices include Taoist ascetics such as Li Quan. and legendary female heroes, such as Zhongli Chun, Fan Lihua, Bai Suzhen, Zhu Yingtai, Mu Guiying, Liu Jinding, these women are heroine era.

The ancient origins of Lishan Laomu appears lost to "time immemorial". A certain woman of Lishan living at the end of the Shang dynasty has been proposed as a historical prototypeby a late Qing dynasty scholar Yu Yue (d. 1907), who insisted the personage was real and not fictional. However recent scholars have skeptically labeled it as conjecture without firm proof. The historical figure is recorded in the Shiji (Records of the Grand Historian) and Hanshu (The Book of Han). The older text, the Shiji from the Former Han period, states that the Marquis of Shen, ruler during the Zhou dynasty had a certain woman ancestor born at Mt. Li, who married a western barbarian chieftain named Xuxuan; Xuxuan then swore fealty to Zhou dynasty China and guarded the Western March, thus bringing the western peoples (the xirong 西戎) under control. The Later Han (Eastern Han) compilation Han shu stated that the "Lady of Li Mountain" once ruled as the Child of Heaven between the Shang(17th-11th cent. BC) and Zhou (11th. cent.-221 BC) dynasties.

A divine woman or "nymph" (神女) associated with the hot spring west or northwest of Mt. Li was encountered by the first emperor of China Qin Shi Huang from the nearby capital city of Xianyang, according to a lost Late Han source, the San Qinji (三秦記, ′Record of the Three Qin′), and scholars believe this "nymph" should be identified with Lishan Laomu. At the time of the First Emperor, there was a crossway of eighty li to Mount Li, and  people walked over the bridge, carts drove under the bridge. The pillars of metal and stone could still be seen. To the west (or northwest) of Mt. Li, there are hot springs, and it is said that Qin Shi Huang cavorted with (made love to) the divine woman or "nymph" there. As he was ill-mannered, the goddess spat at him, causing sores to develop. The First Emperor apologized, and the divine woman made a hot spring appear, which cured his illness. Because of that, later generations used to bathe there.

During the Tang Dynasty, Taoist Li Quan was a military governor fond of the way of the immortals who often travelled to spiritual places in the mountains; according to legend, he met with Lishan Laomu at the foot of Lishan Mountain, and Laomu taught him the Huangdi Yinfujing (The Yellow Emperor's Scripture on "Unconscious Unification").

The old zaju or operatic version text of  styles the Lishan Laomu as the elder sister of the protagonist, the Monkey King Sun Wukong. The zaju version is made confusing because the title  ('Great Sage Equal to Heaven') which normally refers to Sun Wukong himself{{Refn|group="lower-alpha"|As is the case in the book version of the Journey to the West", and the enshrining conventions and practices of the Taoist Chinese folk religion.}} is conferred to a supposed elder brother of his; meanwhile  Sun Wukong adopts the slightly different title of Tongtian Dasheng ('Great Sage Reaching Heaven').

While the text of the romance version of the Journey to the West mentions the concept of the Immortals of the Upper Eight Caves, it only names divinities other than Li Shan Laomu, however, some baojuan'' scrolls dating to the Qing dynasty period do name her among the "Eight Upper Immortals" (cf. , or  Eight Immortals of the Upper, Middle, and Lower spheres).

A local myth collected in Zhongning County, Ningxia Province in 1986 makes Lishan Laomu and Wangmu Niangniang into sisters who collaborated in the task of mending the sky and earth.

Conflations 
She has often become equated with Nü Wa. Certainly there was a place of Nü Wa's governance on Mount Li, according to medieval sources.

She has also been conflated with Wuji Laomu ('Old Mother of the Ultimate Nothingness').

Places 

Laomu's main temple is called "Lishan Laomu Palace" in Xi'an of Shaanxi Province is the most famous one among those extant temples. The palace is situated on the Xixiu Ridge of Mount Li, Lintong District, Xi'an.

See also
 Nü Wa
 Wusheng Laomu
 Doumu
 Xiwangmu
 Jiutian Xuannü
 Houtu

Explanatory notes

References
Citations

Bibliography

 
 
 

Taoist immortals
Chinese deities
Chinese goddesses
Chinese salvationist religions